Summerfield is an unincorporated community in Maries County, in the U.S. state of Missouri.

History
A post office called Summerfield was established in 1903, and remained in operation until 1957. The name is commendatory.

References

Unincorporated communities in Maries County, Missouri
Unincorporated communities in Missouri